Battery Davis may refer to:

Battery Davis, a coastal artillery battery at Fort Funston, San Francisco, California, United States
Battery Richmond P. Davis, a coastal artillery battery at Fort Travis, Galveston, Texas, United States